Thomas Leahy (16 November 1905 – 17 October 1981) was an Irish hurler. At club level he played for Boherlahan and was the left wing-forward on the Tipperary senior hurling team that won the 1930 All-Ireland Championship.

A native of Tubberadora, County Tipperary, Leahy played his club hurling with Boherlahan and won four Tipperary Senior Championship medals between 1924 and 1928.

Leahy made his first appearance for the Tipperary senior hurling team during the 1927 Munster Championship. In the following years he had several successes, including a Munster Championship medal, and an All-Ireland Championship medal. The latter coming when Tipperary defeated Dublin in the final in 1930.

Leahy's brothers, Paddy, Mick and Johnny, were also All-Ireland medal winners.

Honours

Boherlahan
Tipperary Senior Hurling Championship (4): 1924, 1925, 1927, 1928

Tipperary
All-Ireland Senior Hurling Championship (1): 1930
Munster Senior Hurling Championship (1): 1930

Munster
Railway Cup (1): 1931

References

1905 births
1981 deaths
Boherlahan-Dualla hurlers
Tipperary inter-county hurlers
Munster inter-provincial hurlers
All-Ireland Senior Hurling Championship winners